Force Majeure is a contemporary dance and dance theatre company based in Sydney, Australia, resident at Carriageworks cultural precinct.  its artistic director is Danielle Micich.

The company was established in 2002 by choreographer Kate Champion. Geoff Cobham was associate director of the company from 2002 to 2012, before moving to Adelaide to join the State Theatre Company of South Australia as lighting designer.

Its notable works include Nothing to Lose (2015), concerning fat bodies, and Never Did Me Any Harm (2012), exploring parenting.

References 

Dance companies in Australia
Contemporary dance companies
2002 establishments in Australia